John Clinton may refer to:

 John Clinton, 1st Baron Clinton (died 1315), English peer
 John Clinton, 5th Baron Clinton (died 1464), English peer
 John Clinton, 7th Baron Clinton (died 1514), English peer
 John Clinton, 6th Baron Clinton (c. 1429–1488), English peer